This is a list of United States counties by per capita income. Data for the 50 states and the District of Columbia is from the 2009–2013 American Community Survey 5-Year Estimates; data for Puerto Rico is from the 2013–2017 American Community Survey 5-Year estimates, and data for the other U.S. territories is from the 2010 U.S. Census. State income levels and income data for the United States as a whole are included for comparison. Note that county-equivalents in Louisiana are called "parishes" and in Alaska are called in "boroughs," and also that in Alaska census areas in the Unorganized Borough are county-equivalents. For states where independent cities are county-equivalents, the word "city" is included to identify the independent cities and to differentiate them from counties with identical names; the counties with the identical names have the word "county" following them. The word "county" is included in the names of counties that have names identical to the names of U.S. states or cities to differentiate them.

The 89 permanently-inhabited county-equivalents in the territories of the United States (such as the municipalities of Puerto Rico) are also listed (they are not ranked). Overall, per capita income in the U.S. territories tends to be lower than per capita income in the 50 states and District of Columbia.

The list below excludes the 8 county-equivalents in the U.S. territories that have zero people (Baker Island, Howland Island, Jarvis Island, Johnston Atoll, Kingman Reef, Navassa Island, Northern Islands Municipality and Rose Atoll)—all of these county-equivalents have a per capita income of $0 because no one lives in them. The 3 semi-populated county-equivalents in the U.S. Minor Outlying Islands (Midway Atoll, Palmyra Atoll and Wake Island) are also excluded (total excluded: 11).

Excluding the uninhabited county-equivalents, the county or county-equivalent with the highest per capita income is New York County, New York (Manhattan) ($62,498), and the county or county-equivalent with the lowest per capita income is Manu'a District, American Samoa ($5,441).

List 

Note: This is a very large table and there will be noticeable pauses when sorting.

References

States by income
Income